Mesopsocus laticeps is a species of middle barklouse in the family Mesopsocidae. It is found in Europe and Northern Asia (excluding China), North America, and Southern Asia.

References

Mesopsocidae
Articles created by Qbugbot
Insects described in 1880